Bathycrinus carpenterii is a species of sea lily, a crinoid in the family Bathycrinidae. It is native to the North Atlantic. It was described  by Danielssen & Koren.

The species name honors Dr. William Benjamin Carpenter.

References 

Bourgueticrinida
Animals described in 1877